A flower garden or floral garden is any garden or part of a garden where plants that flower are grown and displayed.  This normally refers mostly to herbaceous plants, rather than flowering woody plants, which dominate in the shrubbery and woodland garden, although both these types may be part of the planting in any area of the garden.

Most herbaceous flowering plants, especially annuals, grow best in a flowerbed, with soil that is regularly dug over and supplemented with organic matter and fertilizer.

Because flowers bloom at varying times of the year, and some plants are annuals, dying each winter, the design of flower gardens usually needs to take into consideration maintaining a sequence of bloom and consistent color combinations through varying seasons. Besides organizing the flowers in bedding-out schemes limited to annual and perennial flower beds, careful design also takes the labour time, and the color pattern of the flowers into account.

Flower color is another important feature of both the herbaceous border and the mixed border that includes shrubs as well as herbaceous plants. Flower gardens are sometimes tied in function to other kinds of gardens, like knot gardens or herb gardens, many herbs also having decorative function, and some decorative flowers being edible.

History

Many, if not most, plants considered decorative flowers originated as weeds, which if attractive enough would sometimes be tolerated by farmers because of their appeal. This led to an artificial selection process, producing ever-prettier (to humans) flowers. This is thought to have occurred for the entire history of agriculture, perhaps even slightly earlier, when people tended to favor naturally occurring food-gathering spots. This may also explain why many flowers function as companion plants to more useful agricultural plants; they had evolved that symbiotic relationship with the food plants before either was domesticated, and therefore was found in the same area, convenient to be selected as an attractive plant.

Once domesticated, though, most flowers were grown either separately or as part of gardens having some other primary function. In the West, the idea of parts of gardens dedicated to flowers perhaps did not become common until the 16th century.

Flower gardens are, 
d, a key factor in modern landscape design and even architecture, especially for large businesses, some of which pay to have large flower gardens torn out and replaced entirely each season, in order to keep the color patterns consistent.

The labour time can be decreased by using techniques such as mulching. In flower meadows, grass growth can be moderated by planting parasitic plants such as Rhinanthus.

Cutting garden

A functional garden used to grow flowers for indoor use rather than outdoor display is known as a cutting garden.  It is usually only a feature of large residences.

The cutting garden is typically placed in a fertile and sunlight position out of public view and is not artistically arranged, as it contains flowers for cutting. Very often flowers for cutting are grown in greenhouses, to protect them from severe weather, and control their time of flowering. The cutting garden may also include a herb garden and ornamental vegetables as well.

Modern alternatives
A simpler alternative to the designed flower garden is the "wildflower" seed mix, with assortments of seeds which will create a bed that contains flowers of various blooming seasons, so that some portion of them should always be in bloom. The best mixtures even include combinations of perennial and biennials, which may not bloom until the following year, and also annuals that are "self-seeding", so they will return, creating a permanent flowerbed.

Another, even more recent trend is the "flower garden in a box", where the entire design of a flower garden is pre-packaged, with separate packets of each kind of flower, and a careful layout to be followed to create the proposed pattern of color in the garden-to-be.

See also

List of garden types
Raised-bed gardening
Bedding (horticulture) 
Herbaceous border

References

External links

 National Garden Bureau
 National Gardening Association
 Winnipeg In Bloom Documentary produced by Prairie Public Television

Types of garden